Cal Collins (May 5, 1933 – August 27, 2001) was an American jazz guitarist.

Born in Medora, Indiana, United States, Collins first played the mandolin professionally as a bluegrass musician in the early 1950s. After service in the Army, he moved to Cincinnati, Ohio, and switched to jazz guitar after hearing swing guitarists Charlie Christian, Irving Ashby, and Oscar Moore. He played in Cincinnati for twenty years.

Benny Goodman hired him in 1976 at the age of 43. He spent three years with the Goodman orchestra and then three years making albums for Concord Jazz. As a leader and sideman, he worked with Scott Hamilton, Warren Vache, Rosemary Clooney, Ross Tompkins, Woody Herman, John Bunch, and Marshal Royal.

In the early 1980s, Collins returned to Cincinnati and slowed down his career. He joined the Masters of the Steel String Guitar Tour in 1993 with Jerry Douglas and Doc Watson and recorded his last album in 1998. In 2001, he died of liver failure.

Discography

As leader
 Cal Collins in San Francisco (Concord Jazz, 1978)
 Ohio Boss Guitar with John Bunch, Carmen Leggio (Famous Door, 1978)
 Cincinnati to L.A. (Concord Jazz, 1978)
 Blues on My Mind (Concord Jazz, 1979)
 By Myself (Concord Jazz, 1980)
 Interplay with Herb Ellis (Concord Jazz, 1981)
 Cross Country (Concord Jazz, 1981)
 Tour de Force with Scott Hamilton, Jake Hanna, Dave McKenna (Concord Jazz, 1981)
 Milestones (Pausa, 1984)
 Crack'd Rib (Mo Pro, 1985)
 Just Friends with Frank Vincent (Mo Pro, 1986)
 Ohio Style (Concord Jazz, 1991)

As sideman
With John Bunch
 Slick Funk (Famous Door, 1978)
 Jubilee (Audiophile, 1984)

With Rosemary Clooney
 Here's to My Lady (Concord Jazz, 1979)
 Rosemary Clooney Sings the Lyrics of Ira Gershwin (Concord Jazz, 1979)
 With Love (Concord Jazz, 1981)
 Rosemary Clooney Sings the Music of Cole Porter (Concord Jazz, 1982)

With Concord Jazz All Stars
 Concord Jazz All Stars at the Northsea Jazz Festival Volume 1 (Concord Jazz, 1982)
 Concord Jazz All Stars at the Northsea Jazz Festival Volume 2 (Concord Jazz, 1983)
 Duke Meets Concord Jazz All Stars (Toshiba, 1996)

With Concord Super Band
 In Tokyo (Concord Jazz, 1979)
 Concord Super Band II (Concord Jazz, 1980)

With Benny Goodman
 Live at Carnegie Hall 40th Anniversary Concert (London, 1978)
 The King (Century, 1978)

With Woody Herman
 Presents a Concord Jam Volume 1 (Concord Jazz, 1981)
 A Great American Evening Vol. 3 (Concord Jazz, 1983)
 We (Eastworld 1983)

With Eiji Kitamura
 Dear Friends (Concord Jazz, 1980)
 No Count (Concord Jazz, 1983)

With Marshal Royal
 First Chair (Concord Jazz, 1979)
 Royal Blue (Concord, 1980)

With Warren Vache
 Jillian (Concord Jazz, 1979)
 Polished Brass (Concord Jazz, 1979)

With others
 Bob Barnard, New York Notes (Sackville, 1996)
 Cal Collins, Michael Moore, Jimmy Madison, and Kenny Poole, S'Us Four (J-Curve, 1998)
 Scott Hamilton, Scott Hamilton 2 (Concord Jazz, 1978)
 Scott Hamilton and Buddy Tate, Scott's Buddy (Concord Jazz, 1981)
 Hank Marr, Hank & Frank (Double-Time, 1998)
 Ross Tompkins, Concord All Stars, Festival Time (Concord Jazz, 1980)

References

1933 births
2001 deaths
American jazz guitarists
Pausa Records artists
20th-century American guitarists
Guitarists from Indiana
American male guitarists
20th-century American male musicians
American male jazz musicians